Allenestrol, or allenoestrol, also known as α,α-dimethyl-β-ethylallenolic acid or as methallenestrilphenol, is a synthetic, nonsteroidal estrogen and a derivative of allenolic acid that was never marketed. A methyl ether of allenestrol, methallenestril (methallenestrol), is also an estrogen, but, in contrast to allenestrol, has been marketed.

See also
 Carbestrol
 Bisdehydrodoisynolic acid
 Doisynolic acid
 Doisynoestrol
 Fenestrel

References

Carboxylic acids
Naphthalenes
Synthetic estrogens